Edgar Ratcliffe (19 January 1863 – 29 July 1915) was an English cricketer.  Born at Liverpool, Lancashire, he made four appearances in first-class cricket.

Ratcliffe played the majority of his club cricket for Sefton Park, before making his first-class cricket debut for Lancashire in 1884 against Kent at Old Trafford, in what was his only appearance for Lancashire. He made further first-class appearances for the Liverpool and District cricket team, playing against the touring Australians in 1886, and twice against Yorkshire in 1887 and 1889. He scored a total of 67 runs in his four first-class matches, with a top score of 28, as well as taking a single wicket.

He died at Birmingham, Warwickshire on 29 July 1915.

References

External links
Edgar Ratcliffe at ESPNcricinfo
Edgar Ratcliffe at CricketArchive

1863 births
1915 deaths
Cricketers from Liverpool
English cricketers
Lancashire cricketers
Liverpool and District cricketers